The following highways are numbered 186:

Ireland
 R186 regional road

Japan
 Japan National Route 186

United States
 Alabama State Route 186
	Arizona State Route 186
 Arkansas Highway 186
 California State Route 186
 Connecticut Route 186
	Georgia State Route 186
 Illinois Route 186 (former)
 K-186 (Kansas highway)
 Kentucky Route 186
 Maine State Route 186
 Maryland Route 186
 Massachusetts Route 186
 M-186 (Michigan highway)
 New Mexico State Road 186
 New York State Route 186
 North Carolina Highway 186
 Ohio State Route 186
 South Carolina Highway 186
 Tennessee State Route 186
 Texas State Highway 186
 Texas State Highway Spur 186
 Farm to Market Road 186 (Texas)
	Utah State Route 186
 Virginia State Route 186
 Wisconsin Highway 186
Territories
 Forest Highway 186 (Puerto Rico)